The Portobello Film Festival is an independent international film festival based in London, which annually premiers over 700 new films, including features, shorts, documentaries, music films, and animation. Additionally, workshops and talks with top film directors (such as Stephen Frears and John Maybury) are also featured. Admission to the three-week-long festival is free of charge.

Origins 

The Film Festival was created in 1996 as a reaction to the state of the British film industry, which was perceived as declining, to provide a forum for new film-makers and give exposure to movies on different formats. Many previously obscure directors have been gained recognition in the industry after debuting at the festival, including Shane Meadows and Guy Ritchie. The festival has been dubbed ‘the wild side of Brit Film’ (Metro), "this pioneering film festival" (Evening Standard), "the biggest celebration of independent film in Europe" (The Independent) and "London’s biggest filmic free-for-all" (Time Out). That the Portobello Film Festival shows tomorrow’s films today is evident in the number of ideas first presented there that regularly crop up in the mainstream.

Dr. Martens Golden Boot Award 

On the last day of the festival, a Golden Boot award is presented to the best new independent film or video, sponsored by Dr. Martens.

External links
 Portobello Film Festival official website
 Film London

References

Film festivals in London
Film festivals established in 1996